A film  also called a movie, motion picture, moving picture, picture, photoplay or (slang) flick  is a work of visual art that simulates experiences and otherwise communicates ideas, stories, perceptions, feelings, beauty, or atmosphere through the use of moving images. These images are generally accompanied by sound and, more rarely, other sensory stimulations. The word "cinema", short for cinematography, is often used to refer to filmmaking and the film industry, and to the art form that is the result of it.

Recording and transmission of film 
The moving images of a film are created by photographing actual scenes with a motion-picture camera, by photographing drawings or miniature models using traditional animation techniques, by means of CGI and computer animation, or by a combination of some or all of these techniques, and other visual effects.

Before the introduction of digital production, series of still images were recorded on a strip of chemically sensitized celluloid (photographic film stock), usually at the rate of 24 frames per second. The images are transmitted through a movie projector at the same rate as they were recorded, with a Geneva drive ensuring that each frame remains still during its short projection time. A rotating shutter causes stroboscopic intervals of darkness, but the viewer does not notice the interruptions due to flicker fusion. The apparent motion on the screen is the result of the fact that the visual sense cannot discern the individual images at high speeds, so the impressions of the images blend with the dark intervals and are thus linked together to produce the illusion of one moving image. An analogous optical soundtrack (a graphic recording of the spoken words, music and other sounds) runs along a portion of the film exclusively reserved for it, and was not projected.

Contemporary films are usually fully digital  through the entire process of production, distribution, and exhibition.

Etymology and alternative terms
The name "film" originally referred to the thin layer of photochemical emulsion on the celluloid strip that used to be the actual medium for recording and displaying motion pictures.

Many other terms exist for an individual motion-picture, including "picture", "picture show", "moving picture", "photoplay", and "flick". The most common term in the United States is "movie", while in Europe "film" is preferred. Archaic terms include "animated pictures" and "animated photography".

"Flick" is in general a slang term, first recorded in 1926. It originates in the verb flicker, owing to the flickering appearance of early films.

Common terms for the field in general include "the big screen", "the silver screen", "the movies", and "cinema"; the last of these is commonly used, as an overarching term, in scholarly texts and critical essays. In early years, the word "sheet" was sometimes used instead of "screen".

History

Precursors 
The art of film has drawn on several earlier traditions in fields such as oral storytelling, literature, theatre and visual arts. Forms of art and entertainment that had already featured moving and/or projected images include:
 shadowgraphy, probably used since prehistoric times
 camera obscura, a natural phenomenon that has possibly been used as an artistic aid since prehistoric times
 shadow puppetry, possibly originated around 200 BCE in Central Asia, India, Indonesia or China
 The magic lantern, developed in the 1650s. The multi-media phantasmagoria shows that magic lanterns were popular from 1790 throughout the first half of the 19th century and could feature mechanical slides, rear projection, mobile projectors, superimposition, dissolving views, live actors, smoke (sometimes to project images upon), odors, sounds and even electric shocks.

Before celluloid 

The stroboscopic animation principle was introduced in 1833 with the stroboscopic disc (better known as the phénakisticope) and later applied in the zoetrope (since 1866), the flip book (since 1868), and the praxinoscope (since 1877), before it became the basic principle for cinematography.

Experiments with early phénakisticope-based animation projectors were made at least as early as 1843 and publicly screened in 1847. Jules Duboscq marketed phénakisticope projection systems in France from circa 1853 until the 1890s.

Photography was introduced in 1839, but initially photographic emulsions needed such long exposures that the recording of moving subjects seemed impossible. At least as early as 1844, photographic series of subjects posed in different positions have been created to either suggest a motion sequence or to document a range of different viewing angles. The advent of stereoscopic photography, with early experiments in the 1840s and commercial success since the early 1850s, raised interest in completing the photographic medium with the addition of means to capture colour and motion. In 1849, Joseph Plateau published about the idea to combine his invention of the phénakisticope with the stereoscope, as suggested to him by stereoscope inventor Charles Wheatstone, and to use photographs of plaster sculptures in different positions to be animated in the combined device. In 1852, Jules Duboscq patented such an instrument as the "Stéréoscope-fantascope, ou Bïoscope", but he only marketed it very briefly, without success. One Bïoscope disc with stereoscopic photographs of a machine is in the Plateau collection of the Ghent University, but no instruments or other discs have yet been found.

By the late 1850s the first examples of instantaneous photography came about and provided hope that motion photography would soon be possible, but it took a few decades before it was successfully combined with a method to record series of sequential images in real-time. In 1878, Eadweard Muybridge eventually managed to take a series of photographs of a running horse with a battery of cameras in a line along the track and published the results as The Horse in Motion on cabinet cards. Muybridge, as well as Étienne-Jules Marey, Ottomar Anschütz and many others, would create many more chronophotography studies. Muybridge had the contours of dozens of his chronophotographic series traced onto glass discs and projected them with his zoopraxiscope in his lectures from 1880 to 1895.

Anschütz made his first instantaneous photographs in 1881. He developed a portable camera that allowed shutter speeds as short as 1/1000 of a second in 1882. The quality of his pictures was generally regarded to be much higher than that of the chronophotography works Muybridge and Étienne-Jules Marey.
In 1886, Anschütz developed the Electrotachyscope, an early device that displayed short motion picture loops with 24 glass plate photographs on a 1.5 meter wide rotating wheel that was hand-cranked to the speed of circa 30 frames per second. Different versions were shown at many international exhibitions, fairs, conventions and arcades from 1887 until at least 1894. Starting in 1891, some 152 examples of a coin-operated peep-box Electrotachyscope model were manufactured by Siemens & Halske in Berlin and sold internationally. Nearly 34,000 people paid to see it at the Berlin Exhibition Park in summer 1892. Others saw it in London or at the 1893 Chicago World's Fair.On 25 November 1894, Anschütz introduced a Electrotachyscope projector with a 6x8 meter screening in Berlin. Between 22 February and 30 March 1895, a total of circa 7,000 paying customers came to view a 1.5-hour show of some 40 scenes at a 300-seat hall in the old Reichstag building in Berlin.

Émile Reynaud already mentioned the possibility of projecting the images of the Praxinoscope in his 1877 patent application. He presented a praxinoscope projection device at the Société française de photographie on 4 June 1880, but did not market his praxinoscope a projection before 1882. He then further developed the device into the Théâtre Optique which could project longer sequences with separate backgrounds, patented in 1888. He created several movies for the machine by painting images on hundreds of gelatin plates that were mounted into cardboard frames and attached to a cloth band. From 28 October 1892 to March 1900 Reynaud gave over 12,800 shows to a total of over 500,000 visitors at the Musée Grévin in Paris.

First motion pictures 

By the end of the 1880s, the introduction of lengths of celluloid photographic film and the invention of motion picture cameras, which could photograph a rapid sequence of images using only one lens, allowed action to be captured and stored on a single compact reel of film.

Movies were initially shown publicly to one person at a time through "peep show" devices such as the Electrotachyscope, Kinetoscope and the Mutoscope. Not much later, exhibitors managed to project films on large screens for theatre audiences.

The first public screenings of films at which admission was charged were made in 1895 by the American Woodville Latham and his sons, using films produced by their Eidoloscope company, and by the – arguably better known – French brothers Auguste and Louis Lumière with ten of their own productions. Private screenings had preceded these by several months, with Latham's slightly predating the Lumière brothers'.

Early evolution 

The earliest films were simply one static shot that showed an event or action with no editing or other cinematic techniques. Typical films showed employees leaving a factory gate, people walking in the street, the view from the front of a trolley as it traveled a city's Main Street. According to legend, when a film showed a locomotive at high speed approaching the audience, the audience panicked and ran from the theater. Around the turn of the 20th century, films started stringing several scenes together to tell a story. (The filmmakers who first put several shots or scenes discovered that, when one shot follows another, that act establishes a relationship between the content in the separate shots in the minds of the viewer. It is this relationship that makes all film storytelling possible. In a simple example, if a person is shown looking out a window, whatever the next shot shows, it will be regarded as the view the person was seeing.) Each scene was a single stationary shot with the action occurring before it. The scenes were later broken up into multiple shots photographed from different distances and angles. Other techniques such as camera movement were developed as effective ways to tell a story with film. Until sound film became commercially practical in the late 1920s, motion pictures were a purely visual art, but these innovative silent films had gained a hold on the public imagination. Rather than leave audiences with only the noise of the projector as an accompaniment, theater owners hired a pianist or organist or, in large urban theaters, a full orchestra to play music that fit the mood of the film at any given moment. By the early 1920s, most films came with a prepared list of sheet music to be used for this purpose, and complete film scores were composed for major productions.

The rise of European cinema was interrupted by the outbreak of World War I, while the film industry in the United States flourished with the rise of Hollywood, typified most prominently by the innovative work of D. W. Griffith in The Birth of a Nation (1915) and Intolerance (1916). However, in the 1920s, European filmmakers such as Eisenstein, F. W. Murnau and Fritz Lang, in many ways inspired by the meteoric wartime progress of film through Griffith, along with the contributions of Charles Chaplin, Buster Keaton and others, quickly caught up with American film-making and continued to further advance the medium.

Sound 
In the 1920s, the development of electronic sound recording technologies made it practical to incorporate a soundtrack of speech, music and sound effects synchronized with the action on the screen. The resulting sound films were initially distinguished from the usual silent "moving pictures" or "movies" by calling them "talking pictures" or "talkies." The revolution they wrought was swift. By 1930, silent film was practically extinct in the US and already being referred to as "the old medium."

Color 
Another major technological development was the introduction of "natural color," which meant color that was photographically recorded from nature rather than added to black-and-white prints by hand-coloring, stencil-coloring or other arbitrary procedures, although the earliest processes typically yielded colors which were far from "natural" in appearance. While the advent of sound films quickly made silent films and theater musicians obsolete, color replaced black-and-white much more gradually. The pivotal innovation was the introduction of the three-strip version of the Technicolor process, first used for animated cartoons in 1932, then also for live-action short films and isolated sequences in a few feature films, then for an entire feature film, Becky Sharp, in 1935. The expense of the process was daunting, but favorable public response in the form of increased box office receipts usually justified the added cost. The number of films made in color slowly increased year after year.

1950s: growing influence of television 
In the early 1950s, the proliferation of black-and-white television started seriously depressing North American theater attendance. In an attempt to lure audiences back into theaters, bigger screens were installed, widescreen processes, polarized 3D projection, and stereophonic sound were introduced, and more films were made in color, which soon became the rule rather than the exception. Some important mainstream Hollywood films were still being made in black-and-white as late as the mid-1960s, but they marked the end of an era. Color television receivers had been available in the US since the mid-1950s, but at first, they were very expensive and few broadcasts were in color. During the 1960s, prices gradually came down, color broadcasts became common, and sales boomed. The overwhelming public verdict in favor of color was clear. After the final flurry of black-and-white films had been released in mid-decade, all Hollywood studio productions were filmed in color, with the usual exceptions made only at the insistence of "star" filmmakers such as Peter Bogdanovich and Martin Scorsese.

1960s and later 

The decades following the decline of the studio system in the 1960s saw changes in the production and style of film. Various New Wave movements (including the French New Wave, Indian New Wave, Japanese New Wave, New Hollywood, and Egyptian New Wave) and the rise of film-school-educated independent filmmakers contributed to the changes the medium experienced in the latter half of the 20th century. Digital technology has been the driving force for change throughout the 1990s and into the 2000s. Digital 3D projection largely replaced earlier problem-prone 3D film systems and has become popular in the early 2010s.

Film theory 

"Film theory" seeks to develop concise and systematic concepts that apply to the study of film as art. The concept of film as an art-form began in 1911 with Ricciotto Canudo's manifest The Birth of the Sixth Art. The Moscow Film School, the oldest film school in the world, was founded in 1919, in order to teach about and research film theory. Formalist film theory, led by Rudolf Arnheim, Béla Balázs, and Siegfried Kracauer, emphasized how film differed from reality and thus could be considered a valid fine art. André Bazin reacted against this theory by arguing that film's artistic essence lay in its ability to mechanically reproduce reality, not in its differences from reality, and this gave rise to realist theory. More recent analysis spurred by Jacques Lacan's psychoanalysis and Ferdinand de Saussure's semiotics among other things has given rise to psychoanalytic film theory, structuralist film theory, feminist film theory, and others. On the other hand, critics from the analytical philosophy tradition, influenced by Wittgenstein, try to clarify misconceptions used in theoretical studies and produce analysis of a film's vocabulary and its link to a form of life.

Language 
Film is considered to have its own language. James Monaco wrote a classic text on film theory, titled "How to Read a Film," that addresses this. Director Ingmar Bergman famously said, "Andrei Tarkovsky for me is the greatest director, the one who invented a new language, true to the nature of film, as it captures life as a reflection, life as a dream." An example of the language is a sequence of back and forth images of one speaking actor's left profile, followed by another speaking actor's right profile, then a repetition of this, which is a language understood by the audience to indicate a conversation. This describes another theory of film, the 180-degree rule, as a visual story-telling device with an ability to place a viewer in a context of being psychologically present through the use of visual composition and editing. The "Hollywood style" includes this narrative theory, due to the overwhelming practice of the rule by movie studios based in Hollywood, California, during film's classical era. Another example of cinematic language is having a shot that zooms in on the forehead of an actor with an expression of silent reflection that cuts to a shot of a younger actor who vaguely resembles the first actor, indicating that the first person is remembering a past self, an edit of compositions that causes a time transition.

Montage 

Montage is the technique by which separate pieces of film are selected, edited, and then pieced together to make a new section of film. A scene could show a man going into battle, with flashbacks to his youth and to his home-life and with added special effects, placed into the film after filming is complete. As these were all filmed separately, and perhaps with different actors, the final version is called a montage. Directors developed a theory of montage, beginning with Eisenstein and the complex juxtaposition of images in his film Battleship Potemkin. Incorporation of musical and visual counterpoint, and scene development through mise en scene, editing, and effects has led to more complex techniques comparable to those used in opera and ballet.

Film criticism 

Film criticism is the analysis and evaluation of films. In general, these works can be divided into two categories: academic criticism by film scholars and journalistic film criticism that appears regularly in newspapers and other media. Film critics working for newspapers, magazines, and broadcast media mainly review new releases. Normally they only see any given film once and have only a day or two to formulate their opinions. Despite this, critics have an important impact on the audience response and attendance at films, especially those of certain genres. Mass marketed action, horror, and comedy films tend not to be greatly affected by a critic's overall judgment of a film. The plot summary and description of a film and the assessment of the director's and screenwriters' work that makes up the majority of most film reviews can still have an important impact on whether people decide to see a film. For prestige films such as most dramas and art films, the influence of reviews is important. Poor reviews from leading critics at major papers and magazines will often reduce audience interest and attendance.

The impact of a reviewer on a given film's box office performance is a matter of debate. Some observers claim that movie marketing in the 2000s is so intense, well-coordinated and well financed that reviewers cannot prevent a poorly written or filmed blockbuster from attaining market success. However, the cataclysmic failure of some heavily promoted films which were harshly reviewed, as well as the unexpected success of critically praised independent films indicates that extreme critical reactions can have considerable influence. Other observers note that positive film reviews have been shown to spark interest in little-known films. Conversely, there have been several films in which film companies have so little confidence that they refuse to give reviewers an advanced viewing to avoid widespread panning of the film. However, this usually backfires, as reviewers are wise to the tactic and warn the public that the film may not be worth seeing and the films often do poorly as a result. Journalist film critics are sometimes called film reviewers. Critics who take a more academic approach to films, through publishing in film journals and writing books about films using film theory or film studies approaches, study how film and filming techniques work, and what effect they have on people. Rather than having their reviews published in newspapers or appearing on television, their articles are published in scholarly journals or up-market magazines. They also tend to be affiliated with colleges or universities as professors or instructors.

Industry 

The making and showing of motion pictures became a source of profit almost as soon as the process was invented. Upon seeing how successful their new invention, and its product, was in their native France, the Lumières quickly set about touring the Continent to exhibit the first films privately to royalty and publicly to the masses. In each country, they would normally add new, local scenes to their catalogue and, quickly enough, found local entrepreneurs in the various countries of Europe to buy their equipment and photograph, export, import, and screen additional product commercially. The Oberammergau Passion Play of 1898 was the first commercial motion picture ever produced. Other pictures soon followed, and motion pictures became a separate industry that overshadowed the vaudeville world. Dedicated theaters and companies formed specifically to produce and distribute films, while motion picture actors became major celebrities and commanded huge fees for their performances. By 1917 Charlie Chaplin had a contract that called for an annual salary of one million dollars. From 1931 to 1956, film was also the only image storage and playback system for television programming until the introduction of videotape recorders.

In the United States, much of the film industry is centered around Hollywood, California. Other regional centers exist in many parts of the world, such as Mumbai-centered Bollywood, the Indian film industry's Hindi cinema which produces the largest number of films in the world. Though the expense involved in making films has led cinema production to concentrate under the auspices of movie studios, recent advances in affordable film making equipment have allowed independent film productions to flourish.

Profit is a key force in the industry, due to the costly and risky nature of filmmaking; many films have large cost overruns, an example being Kevin Costner's Waterworld. Yet many filmmakers strive to create works of lasting social significance. The Academy Awards (also known as "the Oscars") are the most prominent film awards in the United States, providing recognition each year to films, based on their artistic merits. There is also a large industry for educational and instructional films made in lieu of or in addition to lectures and texts. Revenue in the industry is sometimes volatile due to the reliance on blockbuster films released in movie theaters. The rise of alternative home entertainment has raised questions about the future of the cinema industry, and Hollywood employment has become less reliable, particularly for medium and low-budget films.

Associated fields 

Derivative academic fields of study may both interact with and develop independently of filmmaking, as in film theory and analysis. Fields of academic study have been created that are derivative or dependent on the existence of film, such as film criticism, film history, divisions of film propaganda in authoritarian governments, or psychological on subliminal effects (e.g., of a flashing soda can during a screening). These fields may further create derivative fields, such as a movie review section in a newspaper or a television guide. Sub-industries can spin off from film, such as popcorn makers, and film-related toys (e.g., Star Wars figures). Sub-industries of pre-existing industries may deal specifically with film, such as product placement and other advertising within films.

Terminology 
The terminology used for describing motion pictures varies considerably between British and American English. In British usage, the name of the medium is "film". The word "movie" is understood but seldom used. Additionally, "the pictures" (plural) is used semi-frequently to refer to the place where movies are exhibited, while in American English this may be called "the movies", but it is becoming outdated. In other countries, the place where movies are exhibited may be called a cinema or movie theatre. By contrast, in the United States, "movie" is the predominant form. Although the words "film" and "movie" are sometimes used interchangeably, "film" is more often used when considering artistic, theoretical, or technical aspects. The term "movies" more often refers to entertainment or commercial aspects, as where to go for fun evening on a date. For example, a book titled "How to Understand a Film" would probably be about the aesthetics or theory of film, while a book entitled "Let's Go to the Movies" would probably be about the history of entertaining movies and blockbusters.

Further terminology is used to distinguish various forms and media used in the film industry. "Motion pictures" and "moving pictures" are frequently used terms for film and movie productions specifically intended for theatrical exhibition, such as, for instance, Star Wars. "DVD" and "videotape" are video formats that can reproduce a photochemical film. A reproduction based on such is called a "transfer." After the advent of theatrical film as an industry, the television industry began using videotape as a recording medium. For many decades, tape was solely an analog medium onto which moving images could be either recorded or transferred. "Film" and "filming" refer to the photochemical medium that chemically records a visual image and the act of recording respectively. However, the act of shooting images with other visual media, such as with a digital camera, is still called "filming" and the resulting works often called "films" as interchangeable to "movies," despite not being shot on film. "Silent films" need not be utterly silent, but are films and movies without an audible dialogue, including those that have a musical accompaniment. The word, "Talkies," refers to the earliest sound films created to have audible dialogue recorded for playback along with the film, regardless of a musical accompaniment. "Cinema" either broadly encompasses both films and movies, or it is roughly synonymous with film and theatrical exhibition, and both are capitalized when referring to a category of art. The "silver screen" refers to the projection screen used to exhibit films and, by extension, is also used as a metonym for the entire film industry.

"Widescreen" refers to a larger width to height in the frame, compared to earlier historic aspect ratios. A "feature-length film", or "feature film", is of a conventional full length, usually 60 minutes or more, and can commercially stand by itself without other films in a ticketed screening. A "short" is a film that is not as long as a feature-length film, often screened with other shorts, or preceding a feature-length film. An "independent" is a film made outside the conventional film industry.

In US usage, one talks of a "screening" or "projection" of a movie or video on a screen at a public or private "theater." In British English, a "film showing" happens at a cinema (never a "theatre", which is a different medium and place altogether). A cinema usually refers to an arena designed specifically to exhibit films, where the screen is affixed to a wall, while a theater usually refers to a place where live, non-recorded action or combination thereof occurs from a podium or other type of stage, including the amphitheater. Theaters can still screen movies in them, though the theater would be retrofitted to do so. One might propose "going to the cinema" when referring to the activity, or sometimes "to the pictures" in British English, whereas the US expression is usually "going to the movies." A cinema usually shows a mass-marketed movie using a front-projection screen process with either a film projector or, more recently, with a digital projector. But, cinemas may also show theatrical movies from their home video transfers that include Blu-ray Disc, DVD, and videocassette when they possess sufficient projection quality or based upon need, such as movies that exist only in their transferred state, which may be due to the loss or deterioration of the film master and prints from which the movie originally existed. Due to the advent of digital film production and distribution, physical film might be absent entirely. A "double feature" is a screening of two independently marketed, stand-alone feature films. A "viewing" is a watching of a film. "Sales" and "at the box office" refer to tickets sold at a theater, or more currently, rights sold for individual showings. A "release" is the distribution and often simultaneous screening of a film. A "preview" is a screening in advance of the main release.

Any film may also have a "sequel", which portrays events following those in the film. Bride of Frankenstein is an early example. When there are more films than one with the same characters, story arcs, or subject themes, these movies become a "series," such as the James Bond series. And, existing outside a specific story timeline usually, does not exclude a film from being part of a series. A film that portrays events occurring earlier in a timeline with those in another film, but is released after that film, is sometimes called a "prequel," an example being Butch and Sundance: The Early Days.

The "credits," or "end credits," is a list that gives credit to the people involved in the production of a film. Films from before the 1970s usually start a film with credits, often ending with only a title card, saying "The End" or some equivalent, often an equivalent that depends on the language of the production. From then onward, a film's credits usually appear at the end of most films. However, films with credits that end a film often repeat some credits at or near the start of a film and therefore appear twice, such as that film's acting leads, while less frequently some appearing near or at the beginning only appear there, not at the end, which often happens to the director's credit. The credits appearing at or near the beginning of a film are usually called "titles" or "beginning titles." A post-credits scene is a scene shown after the end of the credits. Ferris Bueller's Day Off has a post-credit scene in which Ferris tells the audience that the film is over and they should go home.

A film's "cast" refers to a collection of the actors and actresses who appear, or "star," in a film. A star is an actor or actress, often a popular one, and in many cases, a celebrity who plays a central character in a film. Occasionally the word can also be used to refer to the fame of other members of the crew, such as a director or other personality, such as Martin Scorsese. A "crew" is usually interpreted as the people involved in a film's physical construction outside cast participation, and it could include directors, film editors, photographers, grips, gaffers, set decorators, prop masters, and costume designers. A person can both be part of a film's cast and crew, such as Woody Allen, who directed and starred in Take the Money and Run.

A "film goer," "movie goer," or "film buff" is a person who likes or often attends films and movies, and any of these, though more often the latter, could also see oneself as a student to films and movies or the filmic process. Intense interest in films, film theory, and film criticism, is known as cinephilia. A film enthusiast is known as a cinephile or cineaste.

Preview 

A preview performance refers to a showing of a film to a select audience, usually for the purposes of corporate promotions, before the public film premiere itself. Previews are sometimes used to judge audience reaction, which if unexpectedly negative, may result in recutting or even refilming certain sections based on the audience response. One example of a film that was changed after a negative response from the test screening is 1982's First Blood. After the test audience responded very negatively to the death of protagonist John Rambo, a Vietnam veteran, at the end of the film, the company wrote and re-shot a new ending in which the character survives.

Trailer and teaser 

Trailers or previews are advertisements for films that will be shown in 1 to 3 months at a cinema. Back in the early days of cinema, with theaters that had only one or two screens, only certain trailers were shown for the films that were going to be shown there. Later, when theaters added more screens or new theaters were built with a lot of screens, all different trailers were shown even if they weren't going to play that film in that theater. Film studios realized that the more trailers that were shown (even if it wasn't going to be shown in that particular theater) the more patrons would go to a different theater to see the film when it came out. The term "trailer" comes from their having originally been shown at the end of a film program. That practice did not last long because patrons tended to leave the theater after the films ended, but the name has stuck. Trailers are now shown before the film (or the "A film" in a double feature program) begins. Film trailers are also common on DVDs and Blu-ray Discs, as well as on the Internet and mobile devices. Trailers are created to be engaging and interesting for viewers. As a result, in the Internet era, viewers often seek out trailers to watch them. Of the ten billion videos watched online annually in 2008, film trailers ranked third, after news and user-created videos. Teasers are a much shorter preview or advertisement that lasts only 10 to 30 seconds. Teasers are used to get patrons excited about a film coming out in the next six to twelve months. Teasers may be produced even before the film production is completed.

The role of film in culture 
Films are cultural artifacts created by specific cultures, facilitating intercultural dialogue. It is considered to be an important art form that provides entertainment and historical value, often visually documenting a period of time. The visual basis of the medium gives it a universal power of communication, often stretched further through the use of dubbing or subtitles to translate the dialog into other languages. Just seeing a location in a film is linked to higher tourism to that location, demonstrating how powerful the suggestive nature of the medium can be.

Education and propaganda 

Film is used for a range of goals, including education and propaganda due its ability to effectively intercultural dialogue. When the purpose is primarily educational, a film is called an "educational film". Examples are recordings of academic lectures and experiments, or a film based on a classic novel. Film may be propaganda, in whole or in part, such as the films made by Leni Riefenstahl in Nazi Germany, US war film trailers during World War II, or artistic films made under Stalin by Sergei Eisenstein. They may also be works of political protest, as in the films of Andrzej Wajda, or more subtly, the films of Andrei Tarkovsky. The same film may be considered educational by some, and propaganda by others as the categorization of a film can be subjective.

Production 

At its core, the means to produce a film depend on the content the filmmaker wishes to show, and the apparatus for displaying it: the zoetrope merely requires a series of images on a strip of paper. Film production can, therefore, take as little as one person with a camera (or even without a camera, as in Stan Brakhage's 1963 film Mothlight), or thousands of actors, extras, and crew members for a live-action, feature-length epic.
The necessary steps for almost any film can be boiled down to conception, planning, execution, revision, and distribution. The more involved the production, the more significant each of the steps becomes. In a typical production cycle of a Hollywood-style film, these main stages are defined as development, pre-production, production, post-production and distribution.

This production cycle usually takes three years. The first year is taken up with development. The second year comprises preproduction and production. The third year, post-production and distribution. The bigger the production, the more resources it takes, and the more important financing becomes; most feature films are artistic works from the creators' perspective (e.g., film director, cinematographer, screenwriter) and for-profit business entities for the production companies.

Crew 

A film crew is a group of people hired by a film company, employed during the "production" or "photography" phase, for the purpose of producing a film or motion picture. Crew is distinguished from cast, who are the actors who appear in front of the camera or provide voices for characters in the film. The crew interacts with but is also distinct from the production staff, consisting of producers, managers, company representatives, their assistants, and those whose primary responsibility falls in pre-production or post-production phases, such as screenwriters and film editors. Communication between production and crew generally passes through the director and his/her staff of assistants. Medium-to-large crews are generally divided into departments with well-defined hierarchies and standards for interaction and cooperation between the departments. Other than acting, the crew handles everything in the photography phase: props and costumes, shooting, sound, electrics (i.e., lights), sets, and production special effects. Caterers (known in the film industry as "craft services") are usually not considered part of the crew.

Technology 

Film stock consists of transparent celluloid, acetate, or polyester base coated with an emulsion containing light-sensitive chemicals. Cellulose nitrate was the first type of film base used to record motion pictures, but due to its flammability was eventually replaced by safer materials. Stock widths and the film format for images on the reel have had a rich history, though most large commercial films are still shot on (and distributed to theaters) as 35 mm prints.
Originally moving picture film was shot and projected at various speeds using hand-cranked cameras and projectors; though 1000 frames per minute (16 frame/s) is generally cited as a standard silent speed, research indicates most films were shot between 16 frame/s and 23 frame/s and projected from 18 frame/s on up (often reels included instructions on how fast each scene should be shown). When sound film was introduced in the late 1920s, a constant speed was required for the sound head. 24 frames per second were chosen because it was the slowest (and thus cheapest) speed which allowed for sufficient sound quality. Improvements since the late 19th century include the mechanization of cameras – allowing them to record at a consistent speed, quiet camera design – allowing sound recorded on-set to be usable without requiring large "blimps" to encase the camera, the invention of more sophisticated filmstocks and lenses, allowing directors to film in increasingly dim conditions, and the development of synchronized sound, allowing sound to be recorded at exactly the same speed as its corresponding action. The soundtrack can be recorded separately from shooting the film, but for live-action pictures, many parts of the soundtrack are usually recorded simultaneously.

As a medium, film is not limited to motion pictures, since the technology developed as the basis for photography. It can be used to present a progressive sequence of still images in the form of a slideshow. Film has also been incorporated into multimedia presentations and often has importance as primary historical documentation. However, historic films have problems in terms of preservation and storage, and the motion picture industry is exploring many alternatives. Most films on cellulose nitrate base have been copied onto modern safety films. Some studios save color films through the use of separation masters: three B&W negatives each exposed through red, green, or blue filters (essentially a reverse of the Technicolor process). Digital methods have also been used to restore films, although their continued obsolescence cycle makes them (as of 2006) a poor choice for long-term preservation. Film preservation of decaying film stock is a matter of concern to both film historians and archivists and to companies interested in preserving their existing products in order to make them available to future generations (and thereby increase revenue). Preservation is generally a higher concern for nitrate and single-strip color films, due to their high decay rates; black-and-white films on safety bases and color films preserved on Technicolor imbibition prints tend to keep up much better, assuming proper handling and storage.

Some films in recent decades have been recorded using analog video technology similar to that used in television production. Modern digital video cameras and digital projectors are gaining ground as well. These approaches are preferred by some film-makers, especially because footage shot with digital cinema can be evaluated and edited with non-linear editing systems (NLE) without waiting for the film stock to be processed. The migration was gradual, and as of 2005, most major motion pictures were still shot on film.

Independent 

Independent filmmaking often takes place outside Hollywood, or other major studio systems. An independent film (or indie film) is a film initially produced without financing or distribution from a major film studio. Creative, business and technological reasons have all contributed to the growth of the indie film scene in the late 20th and early 21st century. On the business side, the costs of big-budget studio films also lead to conservative choices in cast and crew. There is a trend in Hollywood towards co-financing (over two-thirds of the films put out by Warner Bros. in 2000 were joint ventures, up from 10% in 1987). A hopeful director is almost never given the opportunity to get a job on a big-budget studio film unless he or she has significant industry experience in film or television. Also, the studios rarely produce films with unknown actors, particularly in lead roles.

Before the advent of digital alternatives, the cost of professional film equipment and stock was also a hurdle to being able to produce, direct, or star in a traditional studio film. But the advent of consumer camcorders in 1985, and more importantly, the arrival of high-resolution digital video in the early 1990s, have lowered the technology barrier to film production significantly. Both production and post-production costs have been significantly lowered; in the 2000s, the hardware and software for post-production can be installed in a commodity-based personal computer. Technologies such as DVDs, FireWire connections and a wide variety of professional and consumer-grade video editing software make film-making relatively affordable.

Since the introduction of digital video DV technology, the means of production have become more democratized. Filmmakers can conceivably shoot a film with a digital video camera and edit the film, create and edit the sound and music, and mix the final cut on a high-end home computer. However, while the means of production may be democratized, financing, distribution, and marketing remain difficult to accomplish outside the traditional system. Most independent filmmakers rely on film festivals to get their films noticed and sold for distribution. The arrival of internet-based video websites such as YouTube and Veoh has further changed the filmmaking landscape, enabling indie filmmakers to make their films available to the public.

Open content film 

An open content film is much like an independent film, but it is produced through open collaborations; its source material is available under a license which is permissive enough to allow other parties to create fan fiction or derivative works, than a traditional copyright. Like independent filmmaking, open source filmmaking takes place outside Hollywood, or other major studio systems.For example, the film Balloon was based on the real event during the Cold War.

Fan film 

A fan film is a film or video inspired by a film, television program, comic book or a similar source, created by fans rather than by the source's copyright holders or creators. Fan filmmakers have traditionally been amateurs, but some of the most notable films have actually been produced by professional filmmakers as film school class projects or as demonstration reels. Fan films vary tremendously in length, from short faux-teaser trailers for non-existent motion pictures to rarer full-length motion pictures.

Distribution 

Film distribution is the process through which a film is made available for viewing by an audience. This is normally the task of a professional film distributor, who would determine the marketing strategy of the film, the media by which a film is to be exhibited or made available for viewing, and may set the release date and other matters. The film may be exhibited directly to the public either through a movie theater (historically the main way films were distributed) or television for personal home viewing (including on DVD-Video or Blu-ray Disc, video-on-demand, online downloading, television programs through broadcast syndication etc.). Other ways of distributing a film include rental or personal purchase of the film in a variety of media and formats, such as VHS tape or DVD, or Internet downloading or streaming using a computer.

Animation 

Animation is a technique in which each frame of a film is produced individually, whether generated as a computer graphic, or by photographing a drawn image, or by repeatedly making small changes to a model unit (see claymation and stop motion), and then photographing the result with a special animation camera. When the frames are strung together and the resulting film is viewed at a speed of 16 or more frames per second, there is an illusion of continuous movement (due to the phi phenomenon). Generating such a film is very labor-intensive and tedious, though the development of computer animation has greatly sped up the process. Because animation is very time-consuming and often very expensive to produce, the majority of animation for TV and films comes from professional animation studios. However, the field of independent animation has existed at least since the 1950s, with animation being produced by independent studios (and sometimes by a single person). Several independent animation producers have gone on to enter the professional animation industry.

Limited animation is a way of increasing production and decreasing costs of animation by using "short cuts" in the animation process. This method was pioneered by UPA and popularized by Hanna-Barbera in the United States, and by Osamu Tezuka in Japan, and adapted by other studios as cartoons moved from movie theaters to television. Although most animation studios are now using digital technologies in their productions, there is a specific style of animation that depends on film. Camera-less animation, made famous by film-makers like Norman McLaren, Len Lye, and Stan Brakhage, is painted and drawn directly onto pieces of film, and then run through a projector.

See also 

 Docufiction (hybrid genre)
 Filmophile
 Lists
 Bibliography of film by genre
 Glossary of motion picture terms
 Index of video-related articles
 List of film awards
 List of film festivals
 List of film periodicals
 List of years in film
 Lists of films
 List of books on films
 Outline of film
 Lost film
 The Movies, a simulation game about the film industry, taking place at the dawn of cinema
 Platforms
 Television film
 Web film

Notes

References

Further reading 

 Burton, Gideon O., and Randy Astle, jt. eds. (2007). "Mormons and Film", entire special issue, B.Y.U. Studies (Brigham Young University), vol. 46 (2007), no. 2. 336 p., ill. .
 Hickenlooper, George (1991). Reel [sic] Conversations: Candid Interviews with Film's Foremost Directors and Critics, in series, Citadel Press Book[s]. New York: Carol Publishing Group. xii, 370 p. .

External links 

 Allmovie – Information on films: actors, directors, biographies, reviews, cast and production credits, box office sales, and other movie data.
 Film Site – Reviews of classic films
 
 Rottentomatoes.com – Movie reviews, previews, forums, photos, cast info, and more.
 IMDb: The Internet Movie Database – Information on current and historical films and cast listings (archived 22 January 1997)

 
19th-century inventions
Articles containing video clips
French inventions
Media formats
Visual arts media